Rahmanullah (born 18 November 2002) is an Afghan cricketer. He made his first-class debut for Mis Ainak Region in the 2018 Ahmad Shah Abdali 4-day Tournament on 1 March 2018. In December 2019, he was named in Afghanistan's squad for the 2020 Under-19 Cricket World Cup. He made his List A debut on 15 October 2021, for Mis Ainak Region in the 2021 Ghazi Amanullah Khan Regional One Day Tournament.

References

External links
 

2002 births
Living people
Afghan cricketers
Mis Ainak Knights cricketers
Place of birth missing (living people)